OCN Thrills is a television channel in South Korea owned by CJ ENM E&M Division, a division of CJ Group. It was formerly known as OCN Action and Super Action. They were focused on both Action film and Thriller film genres.

The channel was recently rebranded as OCN Movies 2, served as sister channel to the recently existed OCN Movies.

References

External links
 

CJ E&M channels
Movie channels in South Korea
Korean-language television stations
Television channels and stations established in 2001
2001 establishments in South Korea